Richard Strode (22 May 1528 – 5 August 1581), of Newnham, in the parish of Plympton St Mary in Devon, was an English Member of Parliament for Plympton Erle in 1553 and 1559. He later served as escheator for Devon and Cornwall from 1565–1566.

He was the eldest son of William Strode of Newnham, Devon and Elizabeth, daughter of Philip Courtenay. He married, on 11 November 1560, Frances (died 7 February 1562), daughter of Gregory Cromwell, 1st Baron Cromwell and Elizabeth Seymour by whom he had a son: William Strode (1562–1637)

Strode died on 5 August 1581, two years after his father, leaving landed property worth over £60 per annum to his son and heir, William, then aged nineteen.

Notes

References
 
 
 

1528 births
1581 deaths
Members of the pre-1707 English Parliament for constituencies in Devon
English MPs 1553 (Edward VI)
English MPs 1559
Place of death missing
Politicians from Plymouth, Devon